Robert Brian Mills (born 16 March 1955) is an English former footballer who played in the Football League as a midfielder for Colchester United.

Career

Born in Edmonton, London, Mills joined Colchester United as an apprentice, breaking into the first-team at the age of 16 by making his debut on 4 March 1972 in a 2–0 win against Brentford at Griffin Park. Mills made 26 appearances for Colchester between 1972 and 1974, making his final appearance on 27 April 1974 in a 1–1 draw with Bradford City at Valley Parade before joining Chelmsford City nominally in the summer of 1974.

References

1955 births
Living people
Footballers from Edmonton, London
English footballers
Association football midfielders
Colchester United F.C. players
Chelmsford City F.C. players
English Football League players